Diwan Videos is a leading multi-channel network, talent management agency, and media production company based in the MENA region, managing top creators and working with leading brands helping grow talents and reach audiences

On the regional level, Diwan is the top viewed YouTube multi-channel network in the Middle East and Africa and the only regional network to rank among the top 100 multi-channel networks globally.  With more than half of its employees YouTube certified, Diwan qualified as one of the earliest YouTube Certified  Partners in the Middle East and Africa.  Diwan specializes in digital content management services, including monetization, online channel optimization and protection of copyrights.

History
Diwan was established in 2010 in Cairo, Egypt, by Ossama Youssef, an entrepreneur, who saw an opportunity to lead in the untapped market of digital entertainment in the region. In two months, Diwan signed agreements with more than 30 customers in Egypt. Shortly after its establishment, the company became a YouTube partner.

The company continued to grow in the following few years with expansions in the region, serving clients in Saudi Arabia, Jordan and Turkey. Today, the company has a regional office in Dubai, United Arab Emirates, serving the Gulf Cooperation Council countries and more than 300 customers from different parts of the world including India, Canada, and the United Kingdom. Some of its biggest clients include Sono Cairo, the owner of Egypt’s Radio and TV legacy productions, the TV channel solely targeting Arab children and their families, Toyor Al Janah TV, the preacher and social reformer Amr Khaled, the animated TV channel in the Middle East Spacetoon, ZeeAlwan, Arabic-dubbed Indian drama TV network, and the public Saudi figure Mohamed Al-Arefe, one of the most followed Muslim preachers in the region.

Services
The company provides a myriad of services ranging from content management, media production, influencer marketing, talent management, social media management and consulting. 

Services for content creators and online advertisers include video content monetization, copyrights protection and channel optimization for increased viewership and revenue. The company also offers a consulting service for advertisers in form of online advertising, sponsorships, branded productions with product placements, and digital campaigns.

Diwan is the first multi-channel network in the Middle East that developed an online dashboard offering financial monitoring of owned channels. Diwan is also known for introducing high quality animation services in the market. Animations projects kicked off with MasriTV, a project by Google aimed for Egyptian Youth. From the notable animation work produced by Diwan is renowned Basmet Amal  radio show hosted by Amr Khaled, converting selections of the aired episodes into digitally distributed animation production.

References

Companies based in Cairo
Companies based in Dubai
2010 establishments in Egypt
Online advertising services and affiliate networks
Multi-channel networks